The Liverpool Women's & Youth Football League, formerly known as the Liverpool County FA Women's League, is an amateur competitive women's association football competition based in Liverpool and run by the Liverpool FA. The league consists of two adult divisions which are in the 7th and 8th tiers of the English women's football pyramid. There is also a Futsal Division. Division One promotes to the tier six North West Women's Regional Football League Division One; Division Two does not relegate to any league. Matches are usually played on Sunday.

Teams
The teams competing during the 2021–22 season are:

Open Age
 BRNESC FC Women
 Halewood Town Women FC
 Marine FC Women
 Mossley Hill Athletic Ladies Development
 Pilkington FC Women
 Southport FC Women
 Tranmere Rovers FC Women Development
 Wirral Phoenix Women FC

References

External links
 Official website

7
Football in Merseyside